Hear and Now is a 2007 documentary film by Irene Taylor Brodsky, winning awards in 2007 at the Sundance Film Festival and the Heartland Film Festival; and garnering a Peabody Award in 2008.

Plot
The filmmaker's parents were both born deaf; and the couple raised children who were not deaf. Paul Taylor and his wife Sally Taylor were in their 60s when they both decided to have cochlear implant surgery, which could permit them to hear for the first time.  The documentary follows what turns out to be a complicated journey from the comfortable world of silence to a  profoundly challenging world of sounds and language.

The documentary introduces the couple's personal histories – childhood years learning to communicate in a special school, experiencing the stigma surrounding deafness in mainstream high schools, and having meaningful careers in the Deaf community at the National Technical Institute for the Deaf.  Paul was a pioneer in development of TDD (telecommunications device for the deaf) which is also known as TTY.

The couple's filmmaker daughter chronicled these surgeries and the aftermath.  The film shows some of the short-term consequences, including both expected and unexpected adjustments each would need to make.  These two deaf people investigate the sounds and meaning of sounds; but learning what not to hear becomes an equally significant challenge. The camera records quite different reactions as the couple struggles to adjust after living deaf for a lifetime.  The effects of the surgeries are not entirely positive.

The film establishes cochlear implant surgery in an intimate family setting rather than the larger context of the Deaf community.

Production
This documentary was co-produced by Vermillion Films and HBO Documentary Films, which reduced the financial risks inherent in the project; and the film was distributed by HBO.

Film festivals

In 2007, Hear and Now won the prize for the Best Documentary at the Heartland Film Festival. At the Sundance Film Festival, the documentary won the Audience Award; and it was nominated for the Grand Jury Prize.

Select list of festival entries

 Heartland Film Festival, Best Documentary, Audience Award, 2007.
 Sundance Film Festival, Audience Award, 2007.
 Middle East International Film Festival
 Biogra Film Festival, Special Jury "Best Life" Award.
 EIDF Film Festival, Audience Award.
 American Film Festival in Moscow.

See also
 List of Peabody Award winners (2000–2009)
 List of films featuring the deaf and hard of hearing

Notes

References
 Courier, David. Hear and Now, Deconstructing Sundance. 2007.
 Deburg, Peter. [https://www.variety.com/index.asp?layout=festivals&jump=review&id=2478&reviewid=VE1117932460&cs=1  "Sundance 2007: Hear and Now (Documentary)"], Variety. January 20, 2007.
 Lowe, Justin.  "Bottom Line: Lacks meaningful context about cochlear implants", The Hollywood Reporter. February 5, 2007.
 Halbfinger, David M. "Coming to Sundance: New Crop of Engaged Indie Films", The New York Times''. November 30, 2006.
  "Hear and Now Released on DVD" . NTID News (National Technical Institute for the Deaf). October 21, 2009.

External links
 Hear and Now, Official website
  HBO documentary films, Hear and Now
 

2007 films
2007 documentary films
American documentary films
Documentary films about deaf people
Peabody Award-winning broadcasts
2000s English-language films
2000s American films
Films about disability